Ana Cecilia Gervasi Diaz is a Peruvian diplomat who has been the country's Minister of Foreign Affairs since 10 December 2022.

Education
Gervasi has a law degree from the Pontifical Catholic University of Peru and postgraduate degrees in international relations and diplomacy from the Diplomatic Academy of Peru. She has a master's degree in international relations from the London School of Economics and completed doctoral studies at the University of Buenos Aires.

Career
A career diplomat, Gervasi has worked as General Director of Economic Affairs, Economic Promotion and Investment Promotion at Peru's Ministry of Foreign Affairs. She has also been Peru's Consul General in Toronto and Washington DC, and a counsellor and delegate of Peru to the United Nations in New York and Geneva, and to  the World Trade Organization.

Gervasi was Deputy Minister of Foreign Trade and was then appointed Deputy Minister of Foreign Affairs in August 2022, the first woman to hold the post.

She was appointed Minister of Foreign Affairs as part of President Dina Boluarte's new cabinet on 10 December 2022, following the arrest and impeachment of Pedro Castillo. None of the 17 ministers appointed are members of a political party with any seats in Congress. On 13 December, Gervasi summoned the ambassadors of Mexico, Bolivia, Argentina and Colombia after their governments had signed a joint communique expressing concerns over Castillo's dismissal and arrest. Gervasi said on Twitter she "reiterated to them that the presidential succession is constitutional and that the decisions of former president Castillo on December 7 materialized a coup d'état".

References

External links
 Government website

Living people
Pontifical Catholic University of Peru alumni
Alumni of the London School of Economics
University of Buenos Aires alumni
Female foreign ministers
Foreign ministers of Peru
Independent politicians in Peru
Peruvian lawyers
Peruvian women lawyers
Peruvian women ambassadors
Permanent Representatives of Peru to the United Nations
21st-century Peruvian politicians
21st-century Peruvian women politicians
Ambassadors of Peru to Canada
Year of birth missing (living people)